Riverside Cemetery is a historic rural cemetery located at Long Eddy in Sullivan County, New York.  It was established in 1885 and contains about 550 markers through 1943.  Located in the cemetery is a frame, Queen Anne style chapel, bluestone sidewalk, and wrought iron fence.

It was added to the National Register of Historic Places in 1993.

References

External links
 

Cemeteries on the National Register of Historic Places in New York (state)
Queen Anne architecture in New York (state)
1885 establishments in New York (state)
Cemeteries in Sullivan County, New York
National Register of Historic Places in Sullivan County, New York
Rural cemeteries